Lambunao, officially the Municipality of Lambunao,  is a 1st class municipality in the province of Iloilo, Philippines. According to the 2020 census, it has a population of 81,236 people.

Geography

Barangays
Lambunao is politically subdivided into 73 barangays.

Climate

Demographics

Economy

References

External links
 Official Website of the Municipality of Lambunao
 [ Philippine Standard Geographic Code]
 Philippine Census Information
 Local Governance Performance Management System

Municipalities of Iloilo